The Chaouia Expedition took place in 1487, when a Portuguese force landed at Anfa and pillaged the region between that city and Larache.

History
In 1487, King John II of Portugal began preparing a fleet to conduct a surprise attack against Morocco, however the plan was dropped. Instead, the king decided to respond to an appeal made to him by Mawlāy Abū al-Ḥadjdjādj Yūsuf ibn Zayyān (Mulei Befageja in Portuguese), a close relative of the Wattasid Sultan, to conduct a punitive expedition against the inhabitants of Chaouia (Enxovia in Portuguese) between Anfa and Larache, who had revolted. 

The expedition departed on August 1487 carrying 150 horsemen and 1000 infantry among crossbowmen and arquebusiers, under the overall command of Dom Diogo Fernandes de Almeida, with Dom João de Ataíde as second-in-command. It anchored in the harbour of Anfa, destroyed in a previous attack in 1469, and Dom Diogo sent scouts or spies ashore to recon the land. 

A number of Andaluzi horsemen joined the Portuguese. Having identified a number of settlements inland, the Portuguese disembarked that night and proceeded to devastate the villages and camps along the coast between Anfa and a region north of Sebou River and five leagues to the south of Larache, which the Portuguese identified as "Alagoas", killing 900 and capturing 300, 400 or 900 persons, horses and cattle.

See also
Conquest of Ceuta
Anfa Expedition (1468)
Conquest of Asilah
Portuguese Asilah
Portuguese Tangier

References

Conflicts in 1487
Battles involving the Wattasid dynasty
Battles involving Portugal
15th century in Morocco
Morocco–Portugal military relations